Tack may refer to:

People

Given name or nickname
 Tacks Latimer (1875–1936), American baseball catcher
 Tacks Neuer (1877–1966), American baseball pitcher 
 Tack Wilson (born 1955), American baseball outfielder
 Wong Tack (born 1959), Malaysian politician
 Irwin "Tack" Kuntz, American pharmaceutical chemist

Surname
 François Tack (–1686), Dutch East India Company officer
 Augustus Vincent Tack (1870–1949), American painter
 Anita Tack (born 1951), German politician of the Left Party
 Erik Tack (born 1958), Belgian politician
 Kerstin Tack (born 1968), German politician of the Social Democratic Party

Implements, and creative or constructive tasks and materials
 Tack (sewing) (also baste or pin), quick, temporary stitching intended to be removed
 Blu Tack, a reusable putty-like pressure-sensitive adhesive used for attaching paper items to walls
 Horse tack, equipment used to allow riding or driving of horses and some other riding animals
 Thumbtack or drawing pin, a short nail or pin easily placed and removed by hand
 Shoe tack, a type of cut nail, used in upholstery, shoe making and saddle manufacture
 Tack weld, a specific short and often temporary type of weld

Sailing
 A tack as a part of the tacking maneuver; in which a sailing boat turns its bow through the wind 
 Tack (sailing), the lower corner of a sail's leading edge 
 Tack (square sail), a type of rigging unique to square sails

Other uses
 Hardtack, a hard cracker or biscuit used for food on sea voyages and by soldiers during the American Civil War.
 Scottish lease, as held by a tacksman
 Tack, another name for stickiness in chemistry
 The Tack, a parliamentary maneuver supported by Tackers in 1704
 The grand tack hypothesis on the origin of the structure of the Solar System
 TACK, a proposed archaeal supergroup, presumably a sister taxon of hypothetical Asgard taxon within the proteoarchaeota kingdom
 TACK, a proposed network security standard co-created by Moxie Marlinspike 
 Any of the four symbols
right tack 
 down tack 
 up tack 
 left tack

See also 
 TAC (disambiguation)
 Tacking (disambiguation)
 Tact (disambiguation)
 Tak (disambiguation)